Neuzelle is a municipality in the Oder-Spree district of Brandenburg, Germany, the administrative seat of Amt (collective municipality) Neuzelle. It is best known for Cistercian Neuzelle Abbey and its Neuzeller Kloster Brewery.

Geography
The municipal area along the Dorche creek, a tributary of the Oder River, since 2001 also comprises the villages of Bahro, Bomsdorf, Göhlen, Henzendorf, Kobbeln, Möbiskruge, Ossendorf, Schwerzko, Steinsdorf, Streichwitz, and Treppeln. In the west, it stretches up to the Schlaube Valley Nature Park.

History

The abbey was established as Nova Cella on 12 October 1268 by the Wettin margrave Henry III of Lusatia in remembrance of his deceased wife Agnes of Bohemia. Henry had acquired the strip of former Lubusz Land up to Fürstenberg (today's Eisenhüttenstadt) from the Silesian duke Bolesław II Rogatka in turn for his mediation in the duke's conflict with his Piast brother Henry III the White.

Neuzelle  was a filial monastery of the Cistercian Altzella Abbey (Cella) near Nossen in Henry's Margraviate of Meissen. A first convent of brothers took residence here in 1281. From about 1300, a monastery complex was laid out, including a Brick Gothic hall church, which soon became the spiritual centre of the region. The monks were granted large estates, up to Fürstenberg am Oder in the north and Szydłów (Schiedlo) beyond the Oder River in the east.

In 1367, Neuzelle with Lower Lusatia was purchased by the Luxembourg Emperor Charles IV in his capacity as King of Bohemia. The premises were devastated during the Hussite Wars in 1429 and the monks killed or abducted. Rebuilt afterwards, the monastery and its extended possessions with the Lands of the Bohemian Crown became part of the Habsburg monarchy in 1526. It remained Catholic during the Protestant Reformation, even after the Lutheran Electorate of Saxony had acquired the Lusatias from the Habsburg Emperor Ferdinand II by the 1635 Peace of Prague. Heavily demolished in the Thirty Years' War, the church was again rebuilt in a Baroque style including rich interior decorations quite unique in Northern Germany.

By the Final Act of the 1815 Vienna Congress, Lower Lusatia fell to Prussia and was incorporated into the Province of Brandenburg. The abbey was finally securalised by the order of King Frederick William III two years later. The buildings were later used as an orphanage and a teachers' seminary institution. Nevertheless, while the Neuzelle parish church turned Protestant, the abbey church remained Catholic and in 1947 was consecrated as Blessed Virgin Mary pilgrimage church. Today the monastery complex is held by a public foundation run by the State of Brandenburg.

Demography

Twin town
 Langenberg, Westphalia, Germany

Sons and daughters of the community 

 Ignaz Bernhard Mauermann (1786-1841), Catholic bishop
 Julius Fräßdorf (1857-1932), politician (SPD), Saxon President of the Landtag 1919-1923
 Klaus Grebasch (* 1947), soccer player, born in Bahro
 János Donát (1744 – 1830), German-born Hungarian painter

References

Localities in Oder-Spree